The 1980 Calabrian regional election took place on 8 June 1980.

Events
Christian Democracy was by far the largest party, while the Italian Socialist Party made important gains. After the election Bruno Dominijanni, a Socialist, formed a centre-left government comprising Christian Democracy, the Italian Democratic Socialist Party and the Italian Republican Party (Organic Centre-left).

Results

Source: Ministry of the Interior

Elections in Calabria
1980 elections in Italy